Joop Falke (1933–2016), born in Dordrecht on 23 March, died in Oss 3 October; was a Dutch artist and goldsmith.

Life and work 
Joop Falke was a brother of the artist / graphic designer Heinz Falke. He studied at the Academy of Fine Arts and Applied Arts in Arnhem (1955–1958), where he was taught by, among others, goldsmith and jewellery designer French Zwollo jr.

Falke developed his own signature: a no frills, simple, austere approach to ordinary beauty. After his education he settled in Oss. He made jewellery from precious metals, liturgical vessels, Eucharistic work for churches, sculptures, and statues of various materials. He was active 1958–2015. He created many works of art under the Dutch "1% rule" (for the new construction of government buildings 1% of the sale price has been set aside to 'dress' the building with art).

His studio / shop was located in the Houtstraat, in the centre of Oss. Falke was for 25 years a lecturer at the Free Academy in Oss. He taught silver and goldsmithing techniques, and jewellery. He was awarded in 2013 with the Osje of Merit, the official award of the municipality of Oss, as a token of appreciation and gratitude for his work as a goldsmith / artist. He was a member of the AKKV and the Brabant Foundation for the Visual Arts.

In January 2016, Joop Falke was exhibited at the Politics café "Salt" at the Groene Engel in Oss. He died later that year, at the age of 83.

Photo gallery
Jewelry

Eucharistic objects

Sculptures

Bibliography 
Kinderen Falke, i.s.m. Joop Falke: Joop Falke, edelsmid. Bloemlezing, 2014. Uitgegeven in eigen beheer (oplage 170 stuks).
 ARTindex Noord-Brabant

References

External links

Dutch sculptors
Dutch male sculptors
1933 births
2016 deaths